Nautical Channel is a nautical sports and lifestyle television channel. It is available to over 20 million subscribers in 44 countries in English, French and German. It is on over one hundred international pay TV, satellite, subscriber IpTV, mobile phone, Digital Terrestrial, MMDS and cable TV platforms. The channel was founded by Andrew Miller and Laurence Fox Hopper.

References

External links
 

Sports television channels in the United Kingdom
Television channels and stations established in 2011
Television stations in France